Keshavarz (also Romanized as Keshāvarz; also known as Kashāvar) is a city in Keshavarz District of Shahin Dezh County, West Azerbaijan province, Iran. At the 2006 census, its population was 3,538 in 940 households. The following census in 2011 counted 3,904 people in 1,154 households. The latest census in 2016 showed a population of 4,138 people in 1,248 households. The city is populated by Azerbaijanians. 

Keshavarz is on the Zarrineh River.

References 

Shahin Dezh County

Cities in West Azerbaijan Province

Populated places in West Azerbaijan Province

Populated places in Shahin Dezh County